A skew heap (or self-adjusting heap) is a heap data structure implemented as a binary tree. Skew heaps are advantageous because of their ability to merge more quickly than binary heaps. In contrast with binary heaps, there are no structural constraints, so there is no guarantee that the height of the tree is logarithmic. Only two conditions must be satisfied:
 The general heap order must be enforced
 Every operation (add, remove_min, merge) on two skew heaps must be done using a special skew heap merge.
A skew heap is a self-adjusting form of a leftist heap which attempts to maintain balance by unconditionally swapping all nodes in the merge path when merging two heaps. (The merge operation is also used when adding and removing values.) 
With no structural constraints, it may seem that a skew heap would be horribly inefficient. However, amortized complexity analysis can be used to demonstrate that all operations on a skew heap can be done in O(log n).
In fact, with  denoting the golden ratio, the exact amortized complexity is known to be logφ n (approximately 1.44 log2 n).

Definition 
Skew heaps may be described with the following recursive definition:

A heap with only one element is a skew heap.

Operations

Merging two heaps 
When two skew heaps are to be merged, we can use a similar process as the merge of two leftist heaps:

 Compare roots of two heaps; let  be the heap with the smaller root, and q be the other heap. Let  be the name of the resulting new heap.
 Now, compute r's left subtree by recursively merging p's right subtree with q.

template<class T, class CompareFunction>
SkewNode<T>* CSkewHeap<T, CompareFunction>::_Merge(SkewNode<T>* root_1, SkewNode<T>* root_2)
{
    SkewNode<T>* firstRoot = root_1;
    SkewNode<T>* secondRoot = root_2;

    if (firstRoot == NULL)
        return secondRoot;

    else if (secondRoot == NULL)
        return firstRoot;

    if (sh_compare->Less(firstRoot->key, secondRoot->key))
    {
        SkewNode<T>* tempHeap = firstRoot->rightNode;
        firstRoot->rightNode = firstRoot->leftNode;
        firstRoot->leftNode = _Merge(secondRoot, tempHeap);
        return firstRoot;
    }
    else
        return _Merge(secondRoot, firstRoot);
}

Before:

after

Non-recursive merging 
Alternatively, there is a non-recursive approach which is more wordy, and does require some sorting at the outset.

Split each heap into subtrees by cutting every path. (From the root node, sever the right node and make the right child its own subtree.) This will result in a set of trees in which the root either only has a left child or no children at all.
Sort the subtrees in ascending order based on the value of the root node of each subtree.
While there are still multiple subtrees, iteratively recombine the last two (from right to left).
 If the root of the second-to-last subtree has a left child, swap it to be the right child.
 Link the root of the last subtree as the left child of the second-to-last subtree.

Adding values 

Adding a value to a skew heap is like merging a tree with one node together with the original tree.

Removing values 

Removing the first value in a heap can be accomplished by removing the root and merging its child subtrees.

Implementation 

In many functional languages, skew heaps become extremely simple to implement.  Here is a complete sample implementation in Haskell.

data SkewHeap a = Empty
                | Node a (SkewHeap a) (SkewHeap a)

singleton :: Ord a => a -> SkewHeap a
singleton x = Node x Empty Empty

union :: Ord a => SkewHeap a -> SkewHeap a -> SkewHeap a
Empty              `union` t2                 = t2
t1                 `union` Empty              = t1
t1@(Node x1 l1 r1) `union` t2@(Node x2 l2 r2)
   | x1 <= x2                                 = Node x1 (t2 `union` r1) l1
   | otherwise                                = Node x2 (t1 `union` r2) l2

insert :: Ord a => a -> SkewHeap a -> SkewHeap a
insert x heap = singleton x `union` heap

extractMin :: Ord a => SkewHeap a -> Maybe (a, SkewHeap a)
extractMin Empty        = Nothing
extractMin (Node x l r) = Just (x, l `union` r)

References

External links
Lecture notes,  Skew Heaps, York University
Animations comparing leftist heaps and skew heaps, York University
Javascript skew heap simulation, University of San Francisco
Java applet for simulating heaps, Kansas State University

Binary trees
Heaps (data structures)